The Forgotten Mountain is a 2018 Albanian feature film written, directed and produced by Ardit Sadiku. The narrative focuses on a retired Albanian army colonel who finds himself suddenly defrauded of his home by his son. The Forgotten Mountain was shown at the Palic Film Festival.

Plot
Rikard, after losing his property, relies on the kindness of his daughter, Ema, and her husband, Lorenc, who offer him a cabin dwelling in the ‘Accursed Mountains’. Disoriented by the foggy alpine landscape, Rikard travels deep into the mountains, along with Ema and Lorenci, in an attempt to find some peace of mind. However, in the wilderness, the trio encounter a strange man named Alban, who manages a local estate. Alban, posing as a kindly neighbor, takes a sinister personal interest in Ema and therefore starts to manipulate the family.

Cast

 Xhevat Qorraj as Rikardi
 Fatlume Bunjaku as Ema
 Agron Shala as Lorenci
 Kastriot Shehi as Albani
 Merita Gjyriqi as Diella
 Agron Dizdari as Dom Gjovalini
 Igballe Qena as Marta

See also 
 Cinema of Albania

References

External links

2018 films
Albanian-language films
Films directed by Ardit Sadiku
Albanian drama films
2018 drama films